The use of musical instruments in church services has often been seen as an innovation in church worship.  This was the case in both Catholic liturgy and in the Puritan tradition.  In the Catholic liturgy the Gregorian chant was for a thousand years the predominant musical form. In the Puritan tradition, there was traditionally a use of unaccompanied Psalms.

Many Oriental Orthodox Churches, such as the Coptic Orthodox Church, eschew the use of musical instruments in church services.

Conservative Anabaptist denominations, such as the Dunkard Brethren Church, teach:

Some Holiness Churches of the Methodist tradition, such as the Free Methodist Church, opposed the use of musical instruments in church worship until the mid-20th century. The Free Methodist Church allowed for local church decision on the use of either an organ or piano in the 1943 Conference before lifting the ban entirely in 1955. The Reformed Free Methodist Church and Evangelical Wesleyan Church were formed as a result of a schism with the Free Methodist Church, with the former retaining a cappella worship and the latter retaining the rule limiting the number of instruments in the church to the piano and organ.

References

History of musical instruments
Church music